"Chickenlover" is the fourth episode of the second season of the American animated television series South Park. The 17th episode of the series overall, it originally aired on Comedy Central in the United States on May 27, 1998. It marks the first appearance of Stephen Stotch, who is Butters Stotch’s father in later seasons. The episode was written by series co-creators Trey Parker and Matt Stone, along with David R. Goodman, and directed by Parker. In the episode, Officer Barbrady resigns as South Park's only police officer because of his illiteracy. Anarchy ensues, just as chickens are mysteriously being molested across South Park. Barbrady enlists the help of the boys to learn to read and discover who is molesting the chickens. Cartman, meanwhile, masquerades as a police officer.

Plot
Stan, Kyle, Kenny, and Cartman visit the Booktastic Bus, a mobile library. They are initially intrigued, but become uninterested in reading after meeting the strange driver. Word spreads that a pervert is molesting chickens in town. When Officer Barbrady starts the investigation, he is confronted with his illiteracy, which is depicted as a medical condition where a person literally sees strange symbols in place of letters. He resigns in shame and anarchy immediately breaks out. Later, he is put into the boys' class to learn to read.

Barbrady recruits the boys to help him with his task, showing his knowledge of the police code. From then on, Cartman patrols the town on his Big Wheel, enforcing his own brand of justice. The molester is finally caught in the petting zoo and turns out to be the bookmobile driver. He plotted this all along to encourage Barbrady to learn to read. After being given a copy of Ayn Rand's Atlas Shrugged, Barbrady kills the man with a club to the head to teach Cartman how to properly deal with criminals. The town holds a parade for Barbrady, and when he is asked to give a speech, he reveals how Atlas Shrugged convinced him to never read again.

Production
Originally, Cartman was supposed to receive a gun during his stint as a deputy police officer, but Comedy Central's censors were reluctant to show a child with a firearm. The season one episode "Volcano" depicted children wielding firearms, but it was allowed then as the usage was considered less controversial by Comedy Central. The episode was originally titled "Chickenfucker", but it was changed as Comedy Central did not want any profane wording in any of its titles.

Broadcast
"Chickenlover" was originally broadcast on Comedy Central in the United States on May 27, 1998. The second season of the show started in April 1998, with two episodes. Then, on May 20, the episode "Ike's Wee Wee" started a six-episode run of the season.

Home media
"Chickenlover" was released on VHS in April 1999, along with the episode "Ike's Wee Wee", on a video titled South Park: Volume 8. The episode saw its first DVD release in December 1999, on a disc called South Park: Volume 4, which also included "Chickenlover", as well as "Cartman's Mom Is a Dirty Slut" and "Cartman's Mom Is Still a Dirty Slut". South Park: The Complete Second Season was released on DVD on June 3, 2003.

References

External links

 "Chickenlover" Full Episode at South Park Studios
 

1998 American television episodes
South Park (season 2) episodes
Works about police officers
Zoophilia in culture